Lunch lady, in Canada and the US, is a term for a woman who cooks and serves food in a school cafeteria. The equivalent term in the United Kingdom is dinner lady. The role is also sometimes known as cafeteria lady. Sometimes, a lunch lady also patrols the school playgrounds during lunch breaks to help maintain order.

Notable examples
 The Lunch Lady: A Documentary, directed by Leslie Mello, chronicles the story of Sharon Adl Doost, who garnered notoriety for her daily "menu hotline" recordings at the U.S. Geological Survey cafeteria.
 Denise Martin, a contestant on Survivor: China.

In popular culture
 dinnerladies is a British TV sitcom, that aired on BBC1, although it was set in a fictional factory rather than a school.
 Miss Beazley from the Archie Comics franchise is a lunchlady.
 In The Muppet Show, Gladys serves as the cafeteria lady for the Muppet Theater's canteen. In Season Four, Gladys is replaced by Winny.
 Lunchlady Doris is the Springfield Elementary School lunch lady on The Simpsons.
 Adam Sandler on Saturday Night Live performed a song called "Lunch Lady Land" and accompanying skit with Chris Farley dressed up as a lunch lady. The song appeared on Sandler's album They're All Gonna Laugh at You!.
 The school lunch lady plays a key role in the plot of "Earshot", an episode of Buffy the Vampire Slayer.
 Rosa Petitjean is a fictional lunch lady of Kadic Junior High School in the French animated series Code Lyoko.
 Edna is the highly unhygienic lunch lady for Bullworth Academy in the video game Bully. She often coughs, sneezes, and blows cigarette smoke on any food she prepares, believing it "adds flavor." She also is unconcerned about the opinions of health inspectors.
 The band The Darkness has a song named "Dinner Lady Arms" on their album One Way Ticket to Hell... And Back.
 In the Nickelodeon TV series Ned's Declassified School Survival Guide, Lunch Lady Rose (portrayed by Loni Love) is a psychic lunch lady who can see the future in the beans, peas, and corn.
 Mrs. Sara MacGrady, the lunch lady for Lakewood Elementary School in the TV show Arthur.
 In the Nickelodeon animated series, Danny Phantom, the first villain that appears is the Lunch Lady Ghost (voiced by Patricia Heaton in the first appearance, Kath Soucie in later appearances). She does not like any changes to the cafeteria's good meat-based lunch menu and she can also control food (namely meat), to the point of forming it 100% all around herself as a giant evil meat monster.
 In the Nickelodeon series All That, Miss Piddlin (portrayed by Kenan Thompson) is a lunch lady who gets angry at students who don't like peas. Sketches featuring her frequently ending with her singing a pea-themed song parody. One sketch had her competing with another lunch lady (portrayed by Christy Knowings) who mostly serves carrots.
 In the series Johnny Test, one of Johnny's enemies is a lunch lady. This lunch lady has greenish skin and speaks in a German accent. She can be very cruel when students don't eat her disgusting (albeit sometimes healthy) food.
 Jarrett J. Krosoczka wrote and illustrated a Lunch Lady series of children's graphic novels beginning with Lunch Lady and the Cyborg Substitute in 2009; a Universal Pictures movie based on the series was announced and would feature Amy Poehler in the lead role.

References

Education and training occupations
Food services occupations
School meal programs in the United States
Lunch
Gendered occupations